Harlan's Holiday (April 6, 1999 – November 1, 2013) was an American Thoroughbred racehorse who won three Grade 1 stakes  before retiring to stud where he had become a successful sire.

Background
Harlan's Holiday was a bay horse bred by Double D Farm Corp. He was originally sent into training with Kenneth McPeek. He was sired by the Vosburgh Stakes winner Harlan, whose other progeny have included the Haskell Invitational Stakes winner Menifee.

Racing career

2001: two-year-old season
As a two-year-old, Harlan's Holiday won the Cradle Stakes at River Downs Racetrack and finished second to Siphonic in the Breeders' Futurity Stakes at Keeneland in October. His most significant performance of 2001 came on 4 November at Churchill Downs when he contested the one-mile Iroquois Stakes. Ridden by A. J. d'Amico, he won the Grade III event by two and three quarter lengths from Request for Parole.

2002: three-year-old season
In 2002, Harlan' Holiday established himself as a leading contender for the Triple Crown races. After narrowly losing to Booklet in the Fountain of Youth Stakes, he won the Florida Derby by three and a half lengths and the Blue Grass Stakes by four and a half lengths.

Harlan's Holiday went into the 2002 Kentucky Derby as the betting favorite but finished seventh to winner War Emblem.  He then finished fourth to War Emblem in the Preakness Stakes.  In early June, 2002, Harlan's Holiday's trainer was changed to Todd Pletcher.

In the autumn, he won the Pennsylvania Derby at Parx and finished third to Evening Attire in the Jockey Club Gold Cup before finishing unplaced in the Breeders' Cup Classic.

2003: four-year-old season
Harlan's Holiday began his four-year-old season by winning a nine-furlong allowance race at Gulfstream Park on February 2. He then won the Grade I Donn Handicap over the same course and distance three weeks later, beating Hero's Tribute by two and a half lengths. He was then sent to Nad Al Sheba Racecourse for the Dubai World Cup, in which he lost by five lengths to Moon Ballad.

Stud record
Harlan's Holiday was the Champion juvenile sire of 2012, a year in which he established a North American record for 2-year-old earnings of $2,954,556.

Among Harlan's Holiday's  progeny are Shanghai Bobby, the 2012 American Champion Two-Year-Old Colt; Denis of Cork, in 2008 a second-place finisher in the Belmont Stakes and third-place finisher in the Preakness Stakes; and Willcox Inn, winner of the 2011 American Derby, Hawthorne Derby, and Arlington Classic.

In late 2010, WinStar Farm became a part-owner of Harlan's Holiday, and he was moved to their breeding operation near Versailles, Kentucky.

Harlan's Holiday's stud career is profiled in the June 22, 2013, issue of The Blood-Horse.

On November 1, 2013, Harlan's Holiday suddenly collapsed after returning to his stall, having lost use of his hind end. His intestine prolapsed from his rectum, and he went into shock. After multiple attempts to repair the prolapse, the horse was euthanized.

Pedigree

References

1999 racehorse births
2013 racehorse deaths
Racehorses bred in Ohio
Racehorses trained in the United States
Thoroughbred family 4-m